The 2023 Men's Oceania Cup will be the twelfth edition of the Men's Oceania Cup after the cancellation of the 2022 edition due to the COVID-19 pandemic, the biennial international men's field hockey championship of Oceania organised by the Oceania Hockey Federation. It will be held in August 2023. 

Australia are the defending champions, having won all previous editions. The winner will qualify for the 2024 Summer Olympics.

See also
2023 Women's Oceania Cup

References

Oceania Cup
Oceania Cup
Oceania Cup, 2021 Men